Ramiro González Vicente (born 20 April 1962) is a Spanish politician. A member of the Basque Nationalist Party, he has served as Deputy General of Álava since 2015.

Biography
He was born in Burgos, but moved to Vitoria-Gasteiz at the age of four. He studied law at the University of the Basque Country, and subsequently worked as a lawyer for 25 years. He is married and has two children. He has lived in Mendoza since around 2000.

He became a member of the Basque Nationalist Party in 2002, and in 2007 he was elected to the Juntas Generales of Álava. During his first term, he served as deputy spokesman for the party under Deputy General Xabier Agirre. When Agirre left in 2011 after the election of Javier de Andrés, he became spokesman of the party in the Juntas Generales.

References

External links 
 

1962 births
Living people
Politicians from the Basque Country (autonomous community)
Basque Nationalist Party politicians
20th-century Spanish lawyers
People from Vitoria-Gasteiz
People from Burgos
University of the Basque Country alumni
Deputies General of Álava